He Lumin (born 30 October 1981), also known as He Luming, is a Chinese taekwondo practitioner.

She won the championship in welterweight at the 2000 Asian Taekwondo Championships in Hong Kong and at the 2000 World Cup Taekwondo in Lyon. She competed at the 2000 Summer Olympics in Sydney. She won a silver medal in middleweight at the 1998 Asian Games in Bangkok.

References

External links
 
 
 
 

1981 births
Living people
People from Henan
Sportspeople from Henan
Athletes from Henan
Chinese female taekwondo practitioners
Olympic taekwondo practitioners of China
Taekwondo practitioners at the 2000 Summer Olympics
Asian Games medalists in taekwondo
Asian Games silver medalists for China
Taekwondo practitioners at the 1998 Asian Games
Medalists at the 1998 Asian Games
21st-century Chinese women